Kalao, or Kalaotoa, is an Austronesian language of Kalao Island, South Sulawesi, Indonesia. It belongs to the Wotu–Wolio branch of the  Celebic subgroup.

References 

Wotu–Wolio languages
Languages of Sulawesi
Endangered Austronesian languages